Jean de Clamorgan, Lord of Saane, born in 1480 in the diocese of Coutances, was a cartographer, navigator and military commander. Clamorgan is considered to be one of the best French admirals of the Marine Royale.

Biography 
Having long served in the French Navy, Francis I of France made him captain of the Ponant being the first to receive this title. After his defeat at the Battle of Muros Bay in 1543 he retired to his land. He wrote a famous treatise on wolf hunting (La chasse du loup), published in 1567. He was also the author of a world map that Francis put in his library. The exact date of his death is not known.

Notes

References
Clerc-Rampal, Georges./ de La Roncière, Bourel Charles. Histoire de la marine française, Vol 5.
Jean-François Hamel Dictionnaire des personnages remarquables de la Manche, Vol. 2 

French generals
1480 births
16th-century French people
French cartographers
16th-century deaths
16th-century cartographers
Military leaders of the Italian Wars
16th-century French writers
16th-century male writers
French male writers